Agonidium madecassum is a species of ground beetle in the subfamily Platyninae. It was described by Csiki in 1931.

References

madecassum
Beetles described in 1931